Stephens House may refer to:

Stephens House, Sycamore, Illinois, a historic house within Sycamore Historic District
A. J. Stephens House, Chariton, Iowa
Judge Nelson T. Stephens House, Lawrence, Kansas, listed on the National Register of Historic Places (NRHP) in Douglas County
Metcalfe-Stephens House, Independence, Kentucky, listed on the NRHP in Kenton County
Joseph L. Stephens House, Millersburg, Kentucky, listed on the NRHP in Bourbon County
J. Q. A. Stephens House, Union, Kentucky, listed on the NRHP in Boone County
Knapp-Stephens House, New Hebron, Mississippi, listed on the NRHP in Lawrence County
Price-Stephens House, New Hebron, Mississippi, listed on the NRHP in Lawrence County
Hugh and Bessie Stephens House, Jefferson City, Missouri, NRHP-listed
Flock-Stephens Farmstead, Long Valley, New Jersey, listed on the NRHP in Morris County
Stephens Homestead, Mount Olive Township, New Jersey, listed on the NRHP in Morris County
Avirett-Stephens Plantation, Richlands, North Carolina, NRHP-listed
James B. Stephens House, Portland, Oregon, NRHP-listed
Stephens-Lucas House, Pierre, South Dakota, listed on the NRHP in Hughes County
Lamb-Stephens House, Franklin, Tennessee, formerly NRHP-listed
Mitchell M. Stephens House, Beaver, Utah, listed on the NRHP in Beaver County

See also
Stevens House (disambiguation)